Byzantine is the self-titled fourth studio album by American heavy metal band Byzantine. The album was partially crowdfunded through Kickstarter and was released on February 26, 2013,

On November 28, 2012, the band premiered the first single from the album, "Signal Path", on MetalSucks. The second single and accompanying music video for "Soul Eraser" premiered on January 11, 2013, on No Clean Singing.

Track listing

Personnel 
Chris "OJ" Ojeda – vocals, guitar
Tony Rohrbough – lead guitar
Michael "Skip" Cromer – bass
Matt Wolfe – drums

Singles 
 "Signal Path"
 "Soul Eraser"

Byzantine (band) albums
2013 albums